The lords of Mailly were a noble house from Picardy in France.

Mailly
Lists of French nobility